The Russian Automobile Federation (RAF) is an FIA-affiliated association of motorists based in Russia founded in 1991.

History
On 11 December 1992, the FIA General Assembly accepted the RAF as a member of the FIA and granted the RAF the right to exercise sports power throughout the national territory of the Russian Federation.

Victor Kiryanov has served as President of the RAF since 2003, and was most recently re-elected for a further 4 years in 2020.

Use as a representative nationality 

Beginning in 2021, Russian motorsport competitors are designated as representatives of the RAF after the Court of Arbitration for Sport banned Russia from international sporting events following the doping in Russia scandal at the 2014 Winter Olympics in Sochi.

The following entrants were listed as RAF competitors while they were banned from representing Russia.

World Rally Cup results 
The RAF entered the 1994 Rally Finland in the 2-litre category, with one car retiring and the other coming in 22nd (but winning in the A6 class).

References

External links
 

Automobile associations
Auto racing organizations
Sports governing bodies in Russia
Transport organizations based in Russia
Organizations established in 1991
1991 establishments in Russia